Olaf Husby (17 January 1878 – 30 June 1948) was a Norwegian sport shooter who competed in the 1912 Summer Olympics. In 1912 he finished sixth with the Norwegian team in the team military rifle competition. He also participated in the 300 metre free rifle, three positions event and finished 27th.

References

External links
list of Norwegian shooters

1878 births
1948 deaths
Norwegian male sport shooters
ISSF rifle shooters
Olympic shooters of Norway
Shooters at the 1912 Summer Olympics
Sportspeople from Trondheim